Prince Hashem bin Abdullah (born 30 January 2005) is the fourth child and second son of King Abdullah II of Jordan and Queen Rania. Prince Hashem is part of the Hashemite family and is reportedly the 42nd-generation direct descendant of the Islamic prophet Muhammad. He shares his birthday with his father and is second in line to the Jordanian throne, after his elder brother, Crown Prince Hussein. He currently studies at King's Academy, a boarding in Madaba.

He was born at King Hussein Medical Center.

Military career 
He was commissioned in the Jordanian Armed Forces as 2nd-Lieutenant (6 September 2021).

References

|-

Living people
House of Hashim
2005 births
Jordanian people of English descent
Jordanian people of Palestinian descent
Royal children
Sons of kings

id:Pangeran Hashem bin Al Abdullah